Marv Dizaj (also Romanized as Marv Dīzaj, Marov Dīzeh, and Morū Dīzaj; also known as Mārovī Dīzeh, Marovu-Diza, Marow Dīzaj, Mārvī Dīzeh, and Morovu Dīzeh) is a village in Chelleh Khaneh Rural District, Sufian District, Shabestar County, East Azerbaijan Province, Iran. At the 2006 census, its population was 188, in 47 families.

References 

Populated places in Shabestar County